Ntombikayise Nomawisile Sibhidla-Saphetha (born 1973 or 1974) is a South African politician who has represented the African National Congress (ANC) in the KwaZulu-Natal Provincial Legislature since 2011. She was formerly KwaZulu-Natal's Member of the Executive Council (MEC) for Arts, Culture, Sports and Recreation from November 2011 to May 2016, and before that she represented the ANC in the National Assembly from 2009 to 2011.

Early life and career 
Sibhidla-Saphetha was born in 1973 or 1974 in Clermont in Durban in present-day KwaZulu-Natal, then known as Natal province. Her father was Jimmy Mtolo, a regional leader of the South African National Civics Organisation who was assassinated in 2008. She has a diploma in electrical engineering and entered politics through the ANC Youth League, rising through the league's ranks from the leadership of the Clermont local branch to the deputy chair of the Durban West regional branch. She was co-opted onto the Provincial Executive Committee and then the National Executive Committee of the league, before she was elected to the Provincial Executive Committee of the mainstream ANC's KwaZulu-Natal branch in 2008.

Legislative career 
In the 2009 general election, Sibhidla-Saphetha was elected to an ANC seat in the National Assembly. She held the seat until November 2011, when she was appointed to the KwaZulu-Natal Executive Council in a cabinet reshuffle by Premier Zweli Mkhize; she was sworn into the KwaZulu-Natal Provincial Legislature to take up office as MEC for Arts, Culture, Sports and Recreation. At that time she was the youngest MEC in the province. She was retained in that position throughout the rest of Mkhize's tenure and that of his successor Senzo Mchunu; she secured election to her first full term in the provincial legislature in the 2014 general election, ranked tenth on the ANC's provincial party list. However, in May 2016, she was fired from the Executive Council in a reshuffle by Willies Mchunu, who had recently replaced Senzo Mchunu as Premier. 

After her dismissal from the Executive Council, Sibhidla-Saphetha remained an ordinary Member of the Provincial Legislature; she was re-elected to her legislative seat in the 2019 general election, ranked fifth on the ANC's party list.

Personal life 
As of 2011, Sibhidla-Saphetha was married and had two children. Her husband is trade unionist Zola Saphetha.

References

External links 
 
 Hon. NN Sibhidla-Saphetha at KwaZulu-Natal Provincial Legislature

Living people

1970s births
Year of birth uncertain
Members of the KwaZulu-Natal Legislature
African National Congress politicians
21st-century South African politicians
Members of the National Assembly of South Africa